The Shire of Mundaring in Perth, Western Australia was originally established on 17 April 1903 as the Greenmount Road District with a chairman and councillors under the Roads Act 1888. It was renamed Mundaring on 29 March 1934, and with the passage of the Local Government Act 1960, all road districts became Shires with a shire president and councillors effective 1 July 1961.

Chairmen

Presidents

Notes
 Harry Quin Robinson resigned prior to 10 March 1938 due to illness. Frank Hubert Priestley was elected by his colleagues to serve as chairman until after the April elections. Harry Ward was elected unopposed by the board on 12 May 1938 for the following term.

References

 

Lists of local government leaders in Western Australia